Yves Magola Mapanda (born 20 April 1990) is a Congolese football midfielder who plays for Kabuscorp.

References

1990 births
Living people
Democratic Republic of the Congo footballers
Democratic Republic of the Congo international footballers
AS Vita Club players
Kabuscorp S.C.P. players
Linafoot players
Girabola players
Association football midfielders
Democratic Republic of the Congo expatriate footballers
Expatriate footballers in Angola
Democratic Republic of the Congo expatriate sportspeople in Angola